Ribeira do Neiva is a civil parish in the municipality of Vila Verde, Portugal. It was formed in 2013 by the merger of the former parishes Duas Igrejas, Rio Mau, Goães, Godinhaços, Pedregais, Azões and Portela das Cabras. The population in 2011 was 3,807, in an area of 33.76 km2.

References

Freguesias of Vila Verde